Jorge Antonio Vilar Castex (27 June 1931, in Buenos Aires – 17 February 2014) was an Argentinian sailor gold medallist in the Pan American Games and the Snipe World Championships.

He started sailing Snipes with his brother, Carlos, at the Club Náutico San Isidro and entered competition on the class in 1947. He went on to win the World Championship in 1948 as a crew and in 1951 as a skipper, in both cases with his brother Carlos. They also placed second at the 1949 Worlds. In 1953 they finished 6th and in 1958 they were 5th.

Pan American Games
1st place in Snipe at Buenos Aires 1951.

References

1930 births
2014 deaths
Sportspeople from Buenos Aires
Argentine male sailors (sport)
Club Náutico San Isidro
Sailors at the 1951 Pan American Games
Snipe class world champions
Pan American Games gold medalists for Argentina
Pan American Games medalists in sailing
World champions in sailing for Argentina
Medalists at the 1951 Pan American Games